Bijivemula Veera Reddy was an Indian politician from Badvel, Kadapa District.

Reddy was associated with Telugu Desam Party and served in various capacities from Sarpanchto a Cabinet Minister. Reddy played key role Kadapa District TDPactivities until his death in the year 2000. Reddy was a five term Member of the Andhra Pradesh Legislative Assembly.

References

2000 deaths
People from Kadapa district
Telugu Desam Party politicians
Year of birth missing
Members of the Andhra Pradesh Legislative Assembly